The 1977 Western Michigan Broncos football team represented Western Michigan University in the Mid-American Conference (MAC) during the 1977 NCAA Division I football season.  In their third season under head coach Elliot Uzelac, the Broncos compiled a 4–7 record (3–5 against MAC opponents), finished in seventh place in the MAC, and outscored their opponents, 261 to 231.  The team played its home games at Waldo Stadium in Kalamazoo, Michigan.

The team's statistical leaders included Albert Little with 802 passing yards, Jerome Persell with 1,339 rushing yards, and Craig Frazier with 319 receiving yards. Linebacker Howard Nevins and fullback Keith Rogien were the team captains. Tailback Jerome Persell received the team's most outstanding player award. Persell was also named MAC offensive player of the year for the second of what would be three consecutive years.

Schedule

References

Western Michigan
Western Michigan Broncos football seasons
Western Michigan Broncos football